Monterey Blues is an American women's soccer team, founded in 2007. The team is a member of the Women's Premier Soccer League, the third tier of women's soccer in the United States and Canada. The team plays in the North Division of the Pacific Conference.

The team plays its home games in the stadium on the campus of Monterey Peninsula College in Monterey, California. The team's colors are black and red.

Players

Current roster

Notable former players

Year-by-year

Honors

Competition History

Coaches
  Khalid Al-Rasheed 2008–present

Stadia
Stadium at Monterey Peninsula College; Monterey, California 2008–present

Average Attendance

External links
 WPSL Monterey Blues page

Women's Premier Soccer League teams
Women's soccer clubs in California
2007 establishments in California
Association football clubs established in 2007